A full screen effect (sometimes written as fullscreen effect) is any graphics technique that is applied to the entire screen, usually after the rest of the image has been rendered. This is in contrast to effects that are applied to each element of an image—such as a three-dimensional triangle—as it is drawn.  The speed of applying a full screen effect is independent of the complexity of the image.

In 3D rendering applications such as video games, common full screen effects include color filters, depth of field, and full screen bloom. A color filter, for example, may desaturate an image or convert it to grayscale. These effects are usually achieved via 
GPU shaders.

Computer graphics